This is a list of sound art organizations and festivals.

 Het Apollohuis was a space for experimental music and visual arts, focused in particular on sound art, new music, performance art and the new media, founded in Eindhoven, Netherlands, by Remko Scha and Paul Panhuysen in a former 19th century cigar factory in 1980.
 Lydgalleriet, a gallery dedicated to sound art in Bergen, Norway
 NOMAD's "Project ctrl alt del" festival
 Sound and Music
 STEIM, Amsterdam, The Netherlands
 Tellus Audio Cassette Magazine
 Ubuweb, website with a large info archive on the subject.
 XORKO Collaborative Arts Movement

Contemporary music organizations
Lists of music festivals
Music festival organizations
Festival organizations
Lists of art festivals
Sound art